Cliza is a small town in the Cochabamba Department, Bolivia. It is the capital of the Germán Jordán Province and the Cliza Municipality.  Along with Punata, Cliza is the major city in the valle alto of the Cochabamba Department.

History 
It is believed that in the pre-columbine era, men from Cliza were known as "Sapanas" (quechua for braid), given that they wore their hair in a long braid. The Sapana men used to live in Sach'amoqo, abundant of green pastures, next to crystal clear springs, under the bluest sky. Manco Kapac's descendants farmed this land and practiced the three Inca commands: Ama quella (Do not be lazy), Ama llulla (Do not lie), and Ama sua (Do not steal), as well as the ayni.

When the Spaniards arrived, the name Sach'amoqo was changed to Valle de Elisa because, it is said that when they took over the Tawantinsuyu and asked the Quechuas for the sapanas tribe's name, they answered "It's the tribe of the Lisas (Quechua for brave, surly)". The name was then changed to Valle de Cliza when the Spanish crown offered the town's lands as a gift to Pedro Ximenes de Vargas in 1595. When Pedro Ximenes de Vargas died, his daughter Francisa Vargas inherited the lands, who upon her death, left in her will that the lands go to the Santa Clara Monastery. This event resulted in the final formation of el Valle de Cliza. 

In September 21st of 1912, Dr. Eliodoro Villazon Montano founded Cliza as a province by law. Later in 1945, Lieutenant Colonel Gualberto Villarroel modified the title of Provincia Cliza for Provincia German Jordan in honor of his son, illustrious, fallen soldier of the Chaco War.

Education 
The school system in Cliza is the same of Bolivia. Children begin pre-school around 4 years old to then spend 5 years in elementary school which ends in 5th grade. Intermediate education follows elementary school and includes grades 6,7,8. Lastly, high school or secondary school 1ro de secundaria to 4to de secundaria (grades 9,10,11,12 in America). Cliza does not have universities, therefore, the students who wish to pursue higher education, must move to the city of Cochabamba or other departments.

Based on a survey and census from 1992 it was found that approximately 23.6% of the population was illiterate. However, these percentages may have significantly changed due to Mr. President's Evo Morales Ayma's program "Yo Si Puedo" in 2006. The program sought to end illiteracy specially in rural areas, to help adults over 50 years old who predominantly spoke quechua and worked arduous jobs in the field.

Gastronomy and Tourism 
Cliza is mainly known for its famous "Pichon a la brasa" (grilled baby pigeon/squab) which is served with fideo (macaroni) con mani, chuño (freeze-dried potato), potato and onion and tomato. Pichon a la brasa is found, Monday through Sunday, outside of El Mercado Principal. Though Pichon a la brasa is Cliza's main dish, other typical foods include: pique macho, fideos uchu, salchipapas, pacumutus, anticuchos, picana and chicha. The following are the descriptions of the more meticulous dishes from the list.
 Anticucho - Cow's heart thinly sliced, marinated with salt, garlic and soy sauce (varies by stand), grilled, served with potato and spicy peanut sauce (peanut, locoto, garlic, salt, cumin, all ingredients are ground on a table made out of stone, with a round stone)
 Picana - The main ingredient for this dish is pork, cow, chicken and lamb. It is served with humintas (similar to a sweet tamale; it has cheese inside), and potato which are cooked all night in a traditional oven made out of clay. The meats are also cooked all night in a pot made out of clay, at low fire which is fueled with firewood from different trees. 
 Chicha - It's a fermented, alcoholic beverage derived from maize.
The cost of Pichon a la brasa is 35bs., or around $5.5; the other less intricate dishes range from $1.5, to $4. For deserts and other sweets, rosquetes, helado de leche y canela are the more famous from the region.

Tourists come from all sectors of the country, and international tourists are also very common, especially from Europe and surrounding South American countries. The biggest attraction from Cliza are "Fiesta de la Virgen del Carmen", followed by "Feria del Pichon" and "Feria de la Picana" which is the Sunday after Easter; it's a sacred tradition for cliceños. One peculiar fact about the Feria de la Picana is that at the end of the fair there is a competition of around 15 folkloric groups from Cliza and other neighboring towns. This event brings approximately 6,000 tourists each year.

Because Cliza's weather template, with an annual average of 18ºC and 27ºC during the warmer months of summer, make Cliza an ideal spot to visit any time of the year.

Notable people 
 Ramiro Numbela: Highly respected artist. Mr. Numbela made the well-known sculpture from the plaza. He has contributed to several different projects included the "Parque Cretaceo", the statues from Arbieto, and sculpted the dinosaurs for the "Parque de Huellas de Dinosaurio from ToroToro" or Bolivia's Jurassic Park. 
 David Ferrufino Zurita: Mr. Ferrufino is the most well known mechanic and welder from Cliza, though his name is vastly known in other towns from Santa Cruz and other departments. Born in 1941, he emigrated to Argentina at age 15 and specialized in welding; he worked for the biggest ship company from Argentina at the time, Aliscafo. He worked for the Aliscafo company for nearly 35 years to then return to his native Bolivia and open his own mechanic shop. There is no one in Cliza who does not know of Mr. Ferrufino for he has helped even the most hopeless customer, a lady who got her ring stuck on her finger. His specialty is making seed-sowing equipment for tractors from scratch, using scrap metals from his shop.

References

External links 
World Gazetteer

Populated places in Cochabamba Department